Cychrus kvetoslavae is a species of ground beetle in the subfamily of Carabinae. It was described by Deuve in 2006.

References

kvetoslavae
Beetles described in 2006